À tout casser (English titles: The Great Chase, Breaking It Up; Italian title: Quella carogna di Frank Mitraglia) is a 1968 French-Italian film, directed by American blacklisted director John Berry (in exile in France).

Cast 

 Eddie Constantine – Ric
 Johnny Hallyday – Frankie
 Michel Serrault – Aldo Morelli
 Annabella Incontrera – Eva
 Catherine Allégret – Mimi
 Clément Michu – Gus
  – The widow
  – The deceased's cousin
 Robert Lombard – Reggie
  – Charlie
 Hélène Soubielle – Jacqueline
  – Ange
 Yves Beneyton – Toto
 René Berthier – Morelli's partner
 Yves Barsacq – The inspector
  – Albert's daughter
 Hélène Duc – Albert's wife
  – Albert, a bourgeois
  – Frankie's friend
  – Morelli's henchman (uncredited)
 Joël Barbouth
 Charles Dalin
 
 Jean-François Gobbi
 
 Maritin

See also 
 "À tout casser", the title song from the film

References

External links 
 

French crime comedy films
Italian crime comedy films
1968 films
1960s crime comedy films
Films directed by John Berry
Films set in the 1960s
1960s French-language films
1968 comedy films
1960s French films
1960s Italian films